Vladimir Tchesnov is a paralympic swimmer from Russia competing mainly in category B3 events.

Vladimir competed as part of the Russian Paralympic swimming team at the 1996 Summer Paralympics winning a bronze medal in the 100m freestyle, he also finished fourth in both of his other events the 100m butterfly and 50m freestyle.

References

External links
 

Year of birth missing (living people)
Living people
Russian male butterfly swimmers
Russian male freestyle swimmers
Paralympic swimmers of Russia
Paralympic bronze medalists for Russia
Paralympic medalists in swimming
Swimmers at the 1996 Summer Paralympics
Medalists at the 1996 Summer Paralympics
20th-century Russian people
21st-century Russian people